The Flowers, were a Chinese rock band formed in Beijing in 1998. The line-up originally consisted of Dà Zhāng Wěi (lead vocals, guitar) (大张伟), Guō Yáng (bass guitar) (郭阳), and Wáng Wénbó (drums, percussion) (王文博). To expand their sound, the Flowers brought in Shí Xǐngyŭ (guitar) (石醒宇) in 2001. Throughout their career, they recorded and released six studio albums. Following personal struggles with fame and possible tensions with Zhang Wei, Xǐngyŭ left in the summer of 2008. The group held a talent competition looking for a new member before disbanding in June of 2009.

History
Zhang Wei, Guo Yang, and Wang Wenbo met while attending high school. During their early career, they played music in the style of pop punk that was reminiscent of American bands Green Day and Blink-182. The band began playing in local bars and clubs around Beijing. Unable to hide their hunger for commercial success, the band became somewhat aloof from the scene and often derided in some quarters for their attitudes. The trio first signed to a small Beijing-based Chinese independent label, New Bees Music in 1998. A year later, the band released their debut studio album, On the Other Side of Happiness. The album turned out to be a surprise hit as the accessible nature of songs like "Stillness", "Disillusion" and "School's Out" from the album made the band perfect for the music market they had wished to conquer. The band became somewhat credited for helping to give disaffected Chinese youths a resonant voice, as many of them were deeply affected by their songs and felt that the band's lyrics reflected their own life experiences. As a result, punk music in general became more widely known in China.

In light of the band's commercial impact, some over enthusiastic commentators even went as far declaring the Flowers as the true bringers of punk to the Chinese. They pointed out that fans had previously found even the acoustic grunge of Nirvana's MTV Unplugged in New York difficult to comprehend.

The Flowers became involved in a two-year-long lawsuit with their first company, New Bees Music. The dispute almost brought the band to a premature end but was eventually settled out of court. They signed to EMI in 2001 and added a fourth member, guitarist Shi Xingyu. Strawberry Statement, the Flowers' second album was released in December 2001. By this time, the group had become tired of the simple but effective music which had made them popular. The band was looking to diversify its sound.

The Flowers recorded and released their third studio album, I Am Your Romeo, in July 2004. On the album, the band experimented with various musical styles including hip hop and techno. The band seemed to be a long way from their punk roots but were as straightforward as ever in their ideals or lack thereof. Da Zhang Wei said, "We have to earn our living through music... Pleasing our fans is our reason for making music and we don't care about other things." The songs themselves remained fairly upbeat and the lyrics pretty direct, although Zhang Wei softened the tone moderately for some love-related songs. In 2005 the band released the single "Xi Shua Shua." The song became a hit on the mainland. It was included on the band's fourth studio album, Hua Ji Wang Chao, or Blooming Dynasty, released in July 2005. The album won numerous awards around China, sold 200,000 copies within forty days of its release, and was considered a great success in the country's pop music scene. Later that year, The Flowers made an appearance at the China Central Television's Lantern Festival gala show. The group was also nominated by organizers of the Pepsi Music Chart Awards in China for awards in categories such as Best Arrangement, Best Lyrics, Best Composer and Best Rock 'n' Roll Band. The nominations were later revoked due to accusations of plagiarism. Hua Tian Xi Shi, the Flowers' fifth album, was released in October 2006.

Hua Ling Sheng Hui (2007–09)
In 2007, the Flowers began work on their sixth studio album. Hua Ling Sheng Hui, or Flower Age Pageant was released on October 15, 2007, with "Qiong Kaixin" (or "Shiny Happiness") as its lead single. The album marked a step forward for the Flowers as the group went deeper into their Chinese roots, incorporating elements of upbeat music, ballads, and dance pop. In an interview, Zhang Wei explained that his motive was to incorporate traditional Chinese performances and cultural treasures so that the younger audience would embrace traditional Chinese culture. The same year, the Flowers received the award for Best Mainland Band at the China Music Awards. The Flowers were asked to write and perform a Mandarin version of the theme song of the hit Disney film High School Musical 2 which the group agreed to. The band also expressed interest in movie acting and at the time were preparing for a New Year film celebrating 2009 where they would play street rowdies of ancient Beijing who get involved in comical situations.

Shi Xingyu leaves, break-up and solo careers
In July 2008, it was announced by the Flowers' record label that the band's guitarist, Shi Xingyu, had quit the band after seven years with the group. Following Xingyu's departure, the band held a talent competition in Beijing with fifty contestants competing to be the new member of the Flowers. The winner would have been able to participate in the recording of the band's new album and its upcoming tenth anniversary concert tour. However, on June 21, 2009, the Flowers decided to disband. After the band's break-up, Zhang Wei embarked on a solo career, releasing his debut solo album in August 2009.

Controversy

Plagiarism accusations and scandal
The band's increasing fame soon brought their works under closer scrutiny. The group found themselves accused of plagiarism when it was discovered that they had copied at least twelve of their songs from various foreign artists including the song "Xi Shua Shua," which was most under fire due to its similarities to Japanese pop duo Puffy AmiYumi's song "K2G." This also included "Emperor's Favorite" which resembles "Fuori dal Tunnel" by Caparezza as well as "Hua Die Fei", which ostensibly sampled O-Zone's "Dragostea din tei". Zhang Wei and representatives of EMI admitted in an official statement that while the songs were not plagiarized, there were some flaws in the songs. None of the artists have responded to the issue. Because of the media buzz surrounding the band and to avoid disputes and authentication problems, the Flowers chose to drop out of all music award competitions for the rest of 2006. Contrary to his belief, Zhang Wei claims he listens to hundreds of songs every week and when he writes the songs, some melodies come naturally without having to manifest their origins. Zhang Wei claimed to the press that he and his bandmates, having listened up to 100 songs per day, have so many tunes stored in their heads that they "have no time to identify, revise and remove" ones which are not theirs. In 2015, Belgian and Dutch media again reported of an overt case of plagiarism, this time regarding the song "Tong Hua Sheng Si Lian" which closely resembles the song "Heyah Mama" of Belgian girl band K3.

Fighting incident
In 2007, the band was seen eating at a restaurant in Beijing near Chaoyang Park. The group were seen talking and soon started arguing with one another. The incident escalated when Zhang Wei hit another band member (later revealed to be Xingyu) and shoved a man who was trying to intervene, the report said. This whole scene was captured on cell phone by a man nearby who was also in the restaurant. The band's label admitted that there was a dispute, claiming that it was because the band's members had different views on their upcoming album. According to a senior official from the record company, Zhang Yi, the quarrel began when Zhang Wei and another fellow band member expressed differences on the sound of the record. Zhang added that the band felt very pressured during recording after having been involved in a plagiarism scandal. Some have even questioned whether the fight was a mere publicity stunt to promote sales for the forthcoming album, but Zhang Yi stated that the band was too busy to do so.

Band members

Da Zhang Wei

Da Zhang Wei (born Zhang Wei) on 31 August 1983 in Beijing. His inspirations are Green Day, Ramones, and Nirvana.

Shi Xingyu
Shi Xingyu, nicknamed Xiao Yu (小宇), (born 11 January 1983). Xingyu was the last to join the band in 2001. His favorite bands include Blink-182 and Smash Mouth.

Guo Yang
(born 29 May 1978) in Beijing. Yang sees Green Day and Nirvana as sources of inspiration.

Wang Wenbo
Wang Wenbo (born 22 October 1982) in Beijing. His inspirations are Green Day, The Cure, and Nirvana.

Discography 
 Next to Happiness (1999) (幸福的旁边, Xingfu de pangbian)
 Strawberry Statement (2001) (草莓声明, Caomei shengming)
 I Am Your Romeo (2004) (我是你的罗密欧, Wo shi ni de luomiou)
 Blooming Dynasty (2005) (花季王朝, Hua ji wang chao)
 Hua Tian Xi Shi (2006) (花天囍世)
 Flower Age Pageant (2007) (花龄盛会, Hua Ling Sheng Hui)

References

External links
  The Flowers @ Sina.com
  Official Blog
  The Flowers @ Yaogun.com

Mandopop musical groups
Musical groups established in 1998
Musical groups disestablished in 2009
Musical trios
Musical groups from Beijing
Pop punk groups
Musical quartets
Chinese punk rock groups
People involved in plagiarism controversies